Melena del Sur is a town and a municipality located south of the Mayabeque Province, in Cuba. Bordered on the north and northwest by San José de las Lajas, on the east by the municipality of Güines, and west by Batabanó and by the south by the Gulf of Batabanó. In the south shore is located the only beach in the town, Mayabeque Beach. In this beach is the old outlet of the Mayabeque River (called Antiguo Mayabeque).

Geography

The municipality is divided into 5 popular councils (wards or quarters), named after the most important towns, which are: Melena del Sur, Mañalich, Guara, Lechuga and Monte-Zapote. Its population exceeds 20,000 inhabitants of whom about half live in the town.

In the beach area just live few permanent residents and then some fishermen, it is usually a recreation area. With the holiday season, during the months of July and August this move to a large number of people seeking the enjoyment of the water in the company of family and friends. The start of the holiday season is marked by activities organized by the inauguration of the Government in the locality.

History
The foundation date is from the first years of the second part of the 18th century. In 1768 is  the origin in terrain of the llanura of Güines, in the Corral «Melena del Sur» o «San Juan». The 14 of January 1878 is marked the "Ayuntamiento of Melena del Sur", and reorganized in the year 1899.

Foundation:
There are several versions regarding the meaning of the name Melena, which is home to some Greek (Melaine: black) and was the predominant color of some of its most fertile land. Most likely due to the name of a place of early settlers who founded the San Juan de Melena corral, where he later built the first house, which led to the current town. Still debate about whether it was on its shores or in neighboring Batabanó where he first founded the city of Havana in 1515 before being transferred to the northern coast. As a result, the municipal coat of arms is the Latin phrase "HAVANA PRIMO HIC EST CONDIT", i.e.: Here was first founded Havana.

On the local People's Power Municipal is the direction of local government and is composed of several units which yield information on the progress of work as the economy, services, sports, culture, recreation, etc. Relations of solidarity with the City of La Oliva of Spain, who go to the island to support different tasks alongside people.

For Mañalich and Guara, crossing the railroad oldest Cuba and Latin America, which originally reported the cities of San Cristobal de Havana and St. Julian of the Güines, it now extends to the city of Cienfuegos, and is connected to the circuit northern railways.

Economy
The municipality's economy is almost entirely composed of the Agricultural Crops Enterprise, followed by UBPC, CPA and CCS that comprise the Company and Agricultural Gregorio Arlee Mañalich emerged following the demise of its objects in such company as Agro-Industry (2006–2007) and his commitment to agricultural development just like the UBPC, CPA and CCS it. There are farms engaged in animal fattening and poultry are birds, pigs, turkeys, etc. and intensified breeding cattle by other institutions.

Education

In order to Education, the municipality has an integrated system to ensure development of primary, secondary, middle and upper level, plus the emergence of the University of municipalization where three sites are responsible for the preparation of students in different degrees.

The Municipality has two polytechnic institutes where students are studying technical courses such as Accounting, Construction and other related specialties Agriculture among others. Among the pre-university is the Institute of Vocational Sciences Studienkolleg Félix Varela. In each classroom of the different centers are located enseñansa a television crew to be able to provide through this medium the teleclases a different student. In addition, each school has at least one computer lab to enhance the teaching of learners.

Health
The development of Public Health is taking booming at the moment as part of the tasks undertaken by the Cuban Government to improve this system. With the existence of a home where the Mother is given to pregnant women who have problems during pregnancy, a physiotherapy room, a polyclinic with equipment to perform ultrasound, Rayos X, a clinical laboratory, a small recovery room for patients for their needs should be a short time lodging, plus an intensive care room equipped with modern technology for these purposes.

The Municipal Policlinico medical services on call 24 hours a day as well as laboratory services and Rays "X" and intensive care. The unification of the Central Municipal Ambulance Provincial with the Network helps ensure a better service in the care of emergencies.

Culture

For the enjoyment and recreation of its inhabitants the Directorate of Culture has various libraries scattered localities in the municipality, as well as a House of Culture, the Melena del Sur Municipal Museum and an Art Gallery.

See also

Playa Mayabeque
Autopista A3 (Cuba)
List of cities in Cuba
Municipalities of Cuba

References

External links

 Cultural site of Melena del Sur
 Absolut Cuba
 Alfabetization Campaign
 Cultutal Site Directory of Cuba
 Biblioteca
 El Habanero News

Populated places in Mayabeque Province